Don Cherry's Rock'em Sock'em Hockey (also simplified as Don Cherry's Rock'em Sock'em from 1992 to 1997 and Don Cherry from 1998 to 2007) are a series of hockey highlight videos starring noted Canadian hockey commentator Don Cherry. The series was created by Cherry and his son Tim, via the latter's company Tim Cherry Enterprises created and produce the series.

Each video features a compilation of NHL plays, goals, saves, bloopers, and hits, typically focusing on the preceding NHL season, and generally set to backing rock and techno music. Highlights from Cherry's Coach's Corner segment of Hockey Night in Canada are also regularly featured, while many also include a recap of the year's Stanley Cup Playoffs. Some installments (including five from 2010-2017) feature Cherry hosting on location from a hockey arena or hall of fame.

Despite the series name's allusion to the Rock'Em Sock'Em Robots toy, hockey fights are not a primary source of content, with only one or two examples typically featured at the end of most videos, with Don commonly referring to the segment as "tea time" for viewers who don't like "the odd tussle." The title instead alludes to the physical style of hockey that Cherry prefers. The Rock'em Sock'em title was dropped from the series for the 10 installments from 1998 to 2007 due to a naming rights dispute.

The first Rock'em Sock'em Hockey video was released on VHS in December 1989, and quickly became a huge success in the marketplace, subsequently becoming the best selling sports video franchise in Canadian history. The franchise has sold over two million units to date, and continues to be one of the highest selling sports videos, with installments traditionally being released in December for the holiday season. Don Cherry's Rock 'Em Sock 'Em 30 was expected to be the series' final installment upon its release on December 11th, 2018. “I will miss doing it. I loved working with Tim on it for all these years. The only time I was happier was when I used to go see him play hockey,” said Don. “I want to thank all of the fans supporting it and the players who are in the videos too. A lot of them are grandfathers now in their 50s themselves.”

Since 2007, some videos in the series has been sold in the United States under the altered title Don Cherry's Hard Hitting Hockey, though sometimes using the chronology of the original Rock'em Sock'em series to number them despite largely not being released in that market. The 16th-19th releases in the series were re-released with new cover artwork and the Rock'em Sock'em branding as premium giveaways with the cold remedy Cold-fX, as part of their endorsement deal with Cherry. The 10th-14th installments were re-issued in the 2002 box set Don Cherry Penalty Box,  while all installments to that point were re-issued in a collector's DVD box set in 2013 for the series' 25th anniversary.

The final edition was released in 2018, with Cherry announcing that the 30th edition would be the last.

References

External links

Canadian ice hockey films
National Hockey League mass media
CBC Sports
Canadian film series